William III, Count of Burgundy (c. 1110–1127) inherited his father William II's counties Burgundy and Mâcon as his only son, following William II's assassination by his barons in 1125.  William III was himself then assassinated aged only 17 in 1127 and succeeded by Renaud III, son of William III's great-uncle Stephen.

1110s births
1127 deaths
Counts of Burgundy
Counts of Mâcon